Aditi Mittal  is an Indian stand-up comedian, actress and writer. One of the first women to do stand-up comedy in India, Mittal has been rated amongst India's top 10 stand-up comedians by The Times of India. CNNIBN.com named her as one of the top 30 "witty, intelligent and incredibly fun" Indian women to follow on Twitter. Mittal has written columns and articles in Grazia Men magazine, DNA, Firstpost.com and Financial Times (UK, Weekend Edition).

Career 
Mittal is one of the better-known faces of the Indian English stand-up comedy scene in North and West India. In 2009, she was one of the first 5 Indians to be featured in an Indians-only stand-up show called Local Heroes, organized by the U.K based “The Comedy Store.”  Today, she is a regular at Canvas Laugh Factory, Comedy Store Mumbai and has performed at venues and humor festivals across the country, clubs in UK and at Laugh Factory, Los Angeles.

In 2013, Mittal was invited by the BBC for the prestigious 100 Women Conference in London. She first performed her solo show ‘Things they wouldn’t let me say’ in July 2013 at the Canvas Laugh Factory, Mumbai. The tour features an appearance by sex therapist Dr. Mrs. Lutchuke and the “thinking” Bollywood starlet Dolly Khurana.

Along with American and South African comics, Mittal has been featured in the American documentary Stand-Up Planet, which depicts a stand-up comic's quest to find some of the best humor from corners of the developing world. She has appeared on CNN-IBN's Phenking News with Cyrus Broacha, and is a staple on the political satire show Jay Hind. She was one of the founding members of the Ghanta Awards and the Filmfail Awards, two of the biggest parody award shows in India. She has featured in Ripping the Decade with Vir Das, Fools Gold Awards on Comedy Central India, and Bollywood OMG on Channel V.

Mittal was featured on BBC World and BBC America among “India’s trailblazers”, and appeared on BBC Asia with RJ Nihal. Her material has been described as “acerbic and cutting edge”. Her jokes cover everything from Osama bin Laden to sanitary napkins, toddlers to Miss India winners. She says, “My brand of humor is personal. It’s observational.” She developed the character of Dr. (Mrs.) Lutchuke because she did not like the way sex was portrayed by the media. Mittal has spoken at India's 1st Sex Exposition by India Today, WIFT India (Women in Film and Television), Indian School of business, Hyderabad and comedy festivals across the country.

She speaks fluent English and Hindi and has comprehension in French and Spanish.

Mittal believes that humor is the best fix for gravitas. A fan of Tina Fey and Kristen Wiig, she stepped into the stand-up comedy scene after quitting her job in New York and moving to India. Allured by the burgeoning interest in it, she trained herself, subsequently moving on to live performances.

In the end of 2013 and in October of 2014, she was included in the BBC's 100 women. In December 2014, Mittal featured as a part of the Roast panel on the AIB (All India Bakchod) Knockout. In February, she appeared as a guest on BBC Radio 4's The Now Show.

Mittal's YouTube series Bad Girls showcases women activists. The first episode, released in February 2017, focused on Nidhi Goyal.

MeToo Controversy

In 2018, she was accused of sexual harassment by comedian Kaneez Surka. Surka revealed that Mittal forcefully kissed her on the mouth. Mittal turned hostile when Surka brought the issue up and later refused to admit she had done anything, leading to Surka publicly posting what had happened on Twitter. In October 2018, Mittal "said she gave the improv artiste, who was hosting an open mic, a peck on the lips 'as a joke as a part of the act'. and "apologised later to Surka when she realised the discomfort she had caused."

References 

Indian stand-up comedians
Living people
BBC 100 Women
Indian women comedians
Indian columnists
Indian women columnists
21st-century Indian actresses
Women humorists
1987 births